The Museum of Abandoned Secrets (Ukrainian: Музей покинутих секретів) is a 2009 novel written by Oksana Zabuzhko.  The novel, more than 800 pages long, spans six decades of contemporary Ukrainian history.

Critics have compared the book to Thomas Mann's Buddenbrooks and works of Fyodor Dostoyevsky.  The novel, Zabuzhko's third, is a modern multigenerational saga which covers the years 1940 to 2004, framed as investigations by a journalist, Daryna Hoshchynska, of historical events in western Ukraine including the Holodomor, the Ukrainian Insurgent Army, and later political changes, ending just before the Orange Revolution.

The book won the 2010 award for best Ukrainian book, presented by Korrespondent magazine, and the 2013 Angelus Central European Literature Award, presented by the City of Wroclaw. Angelus jury president, Natalya Gorbanevskaya, described the book as a "book that weaves into one history and modernity, the book that features magic, love, betrayal, and death."

See also

 List of Ukrainian-language writers
 Ukrainian literature

References

Ukrainian-language books
Ukrainian novels
History of Ukraine (1918–1991)
2009 novels
History of Ukraine since 1991